Salsa is a latin dance, associated with the music genre of the same name, which was first popularized in the United States in the 1960s in New York City. Salsa is a mixture of Cuban dances, such as mambo, pachanga and rumba, as well as American dances such as swing and tap.

Origin

Salsa dancing — as a dance to accompany salsa music — was popularized in the 1960s. It was primarily developed by Puerto Ricans and Cubans living in New York in the late 1960s and early 1970s. Different regions of Latin America and the United States (including countries in the Caribbean) have distinct salsa styles, such as Cuban, Puerto Rican, Colombian, and New York styles. Salsa dance socials are commonly held in nightclubs, bars, ballrooms, restaurants, and outside, especially when part of an outdoor festival. 

Some debate exists about the exact origins of the name "salsa". Some claim it originated from something musicians shouted while playing to generate excitement. The term was popularized by the record label Fania Records to better market their music, and Fania founder, Johnny Pacheco, says he chose the word "salsa" because of its spicy and hot connotations. Whatever its origin, the term is fitting. Salsa dancing and music are a mixture of styles, just like salsa or "sauce" in Latin American countries is a mixture of ingredients. Originally a street dance, salsa dance steps were more formalized once schools opened up teaching how to dance salsa with a set curriculum. One of the early influential instructors in salsa was Eddie Torres, who helped formalize the timing for New York-style salsa, and popularized the style around the world.

Description
Salsa is a partnered dance where the lead takes the follower through a series of spins and turn patterns to music. Salsa's tempo ranges from about 60bpm (beats per minute) to around 130bpm, although most dancing is done to music somewhere between 80 and 120bpm. The basic Salsa dance rhythm consists of taking three steps for every four beats of music. Salsa dancers can also break apart to dance solo, known as "shines".

The two main styles of salsa are linear and circular. In linear salsa, dancers remain in their "slot", switching places from one side of the slot to the other, similar to West Coast Swing — New York-style salsa and LA-style salsa are both danced this way. The second salsa style is circular salsa. Here, dancers circle around each other, reminiscent of East Coast Swing. Both Cuban and Colombian salsa follow this circular pattern.

Incorporating other dance styling techniques into salsa dancing has become very common for both men and women: shimmies, leg work, arm work, body movement, spins, body isolations, shoulder shimmies, rolls, even hand styling, acrobatics, and lifts.

Venues
Salsa dance socials are commonly held in night clubs, bars, ballrooms, restaurants, and outside, especially if part of an outdoor festival. Salsa dancing is an international dance that can be found in most metropolitan cities in the world. Festivals are held annually, often called a Salsa Congress, in various host cities aimed to attract a variety of salsa dancers from other cities and countries. The events bring dancers together to share their passion for the dance, build community, and share moves and tips. These events usually include salsa dance performers, live salsa music, workshops, open dancing, and contests.

Rhythm
 
Salsa generally uses music suitable for dancing ranges from about 150 bpm (beats per minute) to around 250 bpm, although most dancing is done to music somewhere between 160 and 220 bpm.

The key instrument that provides the core groove of a salsa song is the clave. It is often played with two wooden sticks (called clave) that are hit together. Every instrument in a salsa band is either playing with the clave (generally: congas, timbales, piano, tres guitar, bongos, claves (instrument), strings) or playing independent of the clave rhythm (generally: bass, maracas, güiro, cowbell). Melodic components of the music and dancers can choose to be in clave or out of clave at any point. 

For salsa, there are four types of clave rhythms, the 3-2 and 2-3 Son claves being the most important, and the 3-2 and 2-3 Rumba claves. Most salsa music is played with one of the son claves, though a rumba clave is occasionally used, especially during rumba sections of some songs. As an example of how a clave fits within the 8 beats of a salsa dance, the beats of the 2-3 Son clave are played on the counts of 2, 3, 5, the "and" of 6, and 8.

There are other common rhythms found in salsa music: the chord beat, the tumbao, and the Montuno rhythm.

The chord beat (often played on cowbell) emphasizes the odd-numbered counts of salsa: 1, 3, 5 and 7 while the tumbao rhythm (often played on congas) emphasizes the "off-beats" of the music: 2, 4, 6, and 8. Some dancers like to use the strong sound of the cowbell to stay on the Salsa rhythm. Alternatively, others use the conga rhythm to create a jazzier feel to their dance since strong "off-beats" are a jazz element.

Tumbao is the name of the rhythm that is typically played with the conga drums. It sounds like: "cu, cum.. pa... cu, cum... pa". Its most basic pattern is played on the beats 2, 3, 4, 6, 7 and 8. Tumbao rhythm is helpful for learning to dance contra-tiempo ("On2").  The beats 2 and 6 are emphasized when dancing On2, and the Tumbao rhythm heavily emphasizes those beats as well.

The Montuno rhythm is a rhythm that is often played with a piano. The Montuno rhythm loops over the 8 counts and is useful for finding the direction of the music. By listening to the same rhythm, that loops back to the beginning after eight counts, one can recognize which count is the first beat of the music.

The basic salsa dance rhythm consists of taking three steps for every four beats of music. The odd number of steps creates the inherent syncopation to the Salsa dancing and ensures that it takes 8 beats of music to loop back to a new sequence of steps. Different styles employ this syncopation differently. For "On1" dancers this rhythm is described as "quick, quick, quick, pause, quick, quick, quick, pause".  For "On2" dancers this rhythm is "quick, quick, slow, quick, quick, slow". In all cases, only three steps are taken in each 4-beat measure (or 6 total over 8 beats).

Styles

Over the years many different styles of salsa dancing have evolved around the world. Many of them are compatible with each other, but others are different enough to make dancing between dancers of different styles difficult.

Incorporating other dance styling techniques into salsa dancing has also become common, with dancers of one style incorporating styles and movements of others to create new fusions of dance styles.

New York style
"On 2" style salsa originated in New York and is often referred to as New York style. It is a linear form of salsa, where dancers dance in a slot, similar to LA style salsa. Unlike other styles of salsa, however, New York style is danced on the second beat of the music ("on 2"), and the follower, not the leader, steps forward on the first measure of the music. There is also often a greater emphasis on performing "shines" in which dancers separate themselves and dance solo with intricate footwork and styling— a phenomenon that likely has origins from Swing and New York Tap.

One of the most influential figures in New York style salsa is Eddie Torres (known as "the Mambo King"), who is credited with helping to formalize the on 2 salsa timing (based on mambo) and helping to popularize it by teaching it in dance studios in New York and through early instructional tapes.

New York style salsa emphasizes harmony with the percussive instruments in salsa music, such as the congas, timbales, and clave, since many or all of those instruments often mark the second beat in the music.

Los Angeles style

Los Angeles style salsa (LA style) is danced "on 1" where dancers break forward on the first beat of the music, in contrast to New York style which is danced on 2. LA style salsa is danced in a line or "slot" with dancers exchanging positions throughout the dance, unlike Cuban salsa which is danced in a more circular fashion.

The two essential elements of this dance are the forward–backward basic step and the cross-body lead. In this pattern, the leader steps forward on 1, steps to the right on 2-3 while turning 90 degrees counter-clockwise (facing to the left), leaving the slot open. The follower then steps straight forward on 5-6 and turns on 7-8, while the leader makes another 90 degrees counter-clockwise and slightly forward, coming back into the slot. In total, the couple turned 180° with the follower and leader switching places.

The "Vazquez Brothers" (Luis Vazquez, Francisco Vazquez, and Johnny Vazquez) are credited for the early development and growth of LA Style. Luiz Vazquez was the co-founder of Los Angeles's first salsa dance team, Salsa Brava. The Vazquez Brothers drew influence from stage dances such as tap dance and helped develop LA style's reputation for flashy moves and acrobatics.

Other prominent figures in LA style salsa include salsa promoter Albert Torres, who created the LA Salsa Congress, the first salsa congress in the United States and for many years one of the largest salsa events in the world. Later dancers such as Alex Da Silva, Christian Oviedo, and Liz Lira are also credited with developing the LA style of dancing as we know it today.

Cuban style / Casino

In Cuba, a popular dance known as Casino was marketed as Cuban-style salsa or Salsa Cubana abroad to distinguish it from other salsa styles when the name was popularized internationally in the 1970s. Dancing Casino is an expression of popular social culture; Cubans consider casino as part of social and cultural activities centering on their popular music. The name Casino is derived from the Spanish term for the dance halls, "Casinos Deportivos" where much social dancing was done among the better-off, white Cubans during the mid-20th century and onward.

Historically, Casino traces its origin as a partner dance from Cuban Son, Cha Cha Cha, Danzón and Guaracha. Traditionally, Casino is danced "a contratiempo". This means that, distinct from subsequent forms of salsa, no step is taken on the first and fifth beats in each clave pattern and the fourth and eighth beat are emphasized. In this way, rather than following a beat, the dancers themselves contribute in their movement, to the polyrhythmic pattern of the music. At the same time, it is often danced "a tiempo", although both "on3" (originally) and "on1" (nowadays).

What distinguishes this style is the understanding and spontaneous use of Afro-Cuban dance vocabulary within a "Casino" dance. In the same way that a "sonero" (lead singer in Son and salsa bands) will "quote" other, older songs in their own, a "casino" dancer will frequently improvise references to other dances, integrating movements, gestures and extended passages from folk dances. This is particularly true of African descended Cubans. Such improvisations might include extracts of rumba, dances for African deities, the older popular dances such as Cha Cha Chá and Danzon as well as anything the dancer may feel.

Miami-style Casino
Developed by Cuban immigrants to Florida and centered on Miami, this dance style is a fusion of Casino and elements from American culture and dances. The major difference that distinguishes the Miami-style from other North American styles is the "Atras" or "Diagonal", back breaking steps performed backwards diagonally instead of moving forwards and backwards as seen in the New York style.  Dancers do not shift their body weight greatly as seen in other styles. Instead, dancers keep their upper body still, poised and relaxed, focusing on foot movement. The dancer breaks mostly On1.

A major difference between Cali Style and Miami-style is the latter is exclusively danced on the downbeat (On1) and has elements of shines and show-style added to it, following repertoires of North American styles. Miami-style has many adherents, particularly Cuban-Americans and other Latinos based in South Florida.

Rueda de Casino

In the 1950s Salsa Rueda or more accurately Rueda de Casino was developed in Havana, Cuba. Pairs of dancers form a circle ("Rueda" in Spanish means "Wheel"), with dance moves called out by one person. Many of the moves involve rapidly swapping partners.

"Rueda de Cuba" is original type of Rueda, originating from Cuba. It is not as formal as Rueda de Miami and consists of about 30 calls. It was codified in the 1970s.

"Rueda de Miami" originated in the 1980s from Miami, is a formal style with many rules based on a mix, and is a hybridization of Rueda de Cuba & North American dance styles, with some routines reflecting American culture (e.g. Coca-Cola, Dedo, Adios) which is not found in the traditional Cuban-style Rueda.

Colombian / Cali style

Cali-Style Salsa, also known as Colombian Salsa and Salsa Caleña, is based around the Colombian City of Cali. Cali is also known as the "Capital de la Salsa" (Salsa's Capital); due to salsa music being the main genre in parties, nightclubs and festivals in the 21st century.

The elements of Cali-Style Salsa were strongly influenced by dances to Caribbean rhythms which preceded salsa, such as Pachanga and Boogaloo. Cali has the highest number of salsa schools and salsa teams in the world. Many of the competitions are held in Colombia.

The central feature is the footwork which has quick rapid steps and skipping motions called "repique". Colombian style may execute Cross-body Leads or the "Dile Que No" as seen in other styles, but would rather step in place and displace in closed position. They include various acrobats such as partnered flips to entertain with these jaw dropping stunts. Their footwork is intricate and precise, helping several Colombian Style dancers win major world championships. Cali hosts many annual salsa events such as the World Salsa Cali Festival and the Encuentro de Melomanos y Coleccionistas.

Research situated in salsa dancing 
Academic researchers have used salsa dancing as a productive research site in the social and natural sciences. For example, researchers in the natural sciences studied the mathematics of salsa dancing moves. In the social sciences, researchers have studied salsa dancing to understand, for example how the Latino identity is connected to salsa dancing. The study of salsa dancing has been studied as a metaphor to understand emotional and cultural economies. Salsa dancing has been shown to manifest "moments of luxury" in which people use hedonistic escapism to leave momentarily the constrains of ordinary normal life. and, researchers have also used salsa dancing to study the ephemerality of social groups.

See also
 Salsa music – the music to which salsa is danced
 Mambo – a dance style which heavily influenced salsa dancing
 Palladium Ballroom – a New York City venue that helped popularize Latin music and dance during the 1940s and 1950s
 Rhumba – a ballroom dance that heavily influenced salsa
 World Salsa Championships – a list of international competitions for salsa dancing
 Cuban salsa – a popular form of salsa dancing from Cuba

References

External links 
 

Salsa
Social dance
Latin dances
Ballroom dance